York Mills Collegiate Institute (York Mills C.I., YMCI or York Mills) is a public high school in Toronto, Ontario, Canada. It is part of the Toronto District School Board, offering grades 9–12. It is located in North York along York Mills Road between Leslie Street and Bayview Avenue. Prior to 1998, it was part of the North York Board of Education.

The school emphasizes university preparation and academics. English and French Immersion courses are provided from grades 9 to 12. Windfields Middle School (half French immersion and half English) and St. Andrews Middle School are the two feeder middle schools that make up the majority of York Mills' population. Additionally, Don Valley Middle School is a feeder school to York Mills with only its smaller population of French immersion students.

Origins
York Mills Collegiate's building was designed by the British-Canadian architect Peter Dickinson. Construction began in 1956 and opened its doors on September 3, 1957. York Mills C.I. celebrated its 50th anniversary in 2007.

Extracurricular activities

Sports
York Mills offers a wide variety of extracurricular sports, including:
Badminton,
Baseball,
Softball,
Basketball,
Cross-country Running Team,
Curling,
Field Hockey (girls),
Golf,
Tennis,
Hockey,
Rugby,
Soccer,
Swimming,
Water-Polo,
Track and Field,
Ultimate Frisbee,
Volleyball, and
Weight Training.

Notable alumni
[Albert Lee] - Real Estate Acquisitions and Management 
 Sam Mizrahi - Real Estate Developer
 Jean Yoon - actress and writer
Sasha Gollish – competitive runner
 Dave Hodge
 Young K – member of South Korean band Day6
 Terry Leibel
 John Bitove
Laura Vandervoort - actor, producer, director, writer & Shotokan Karate Nidan
 Dan Shulman Toronto Blue Jays & ESPN play-by-play announcer
Elliotte Friedman Sportsnet hockey reporter & NHL Network insider
 Joana Ceddia - former media personality 
 Jeffrey Skoll
 Andy Yerzy (born 1998), baseball player
 Mark Lutz - Canadian Actor

See also
List of high schools in Ontario

References and footnotes

External links
 York Mills Collegiate Institute
 TDSB Profile

Toronto District School Board
Schools in the TDSB
High schools in Toronto
North York
Peter Dickinson (architect) buildings
Educational institutions established in 1957
1957 establishments in Ontario